Andrei Vladimirovich Mamatyuk (born 13 April 1991) is a Russian professional football player.

Club career
He made his Russian Football National League debut for FC Dynamo Saint Petersburg on 12 August 2013 in a game against FC Shinnik Yaroslavl.

External links
 Career summary by sportbox.ru
 
 
 Profile at Crimean Football Union

1991 births
People from Staraya Russa
Living people
Russian footballers
Russian expatriate footballers
Expatriate footballers in Finland
Expatriate footballers in Belarus
FC Spartak Moscow players
FC Orenburg players
FC Volga Nizhny Novgorod players
FC Tyumen players
FC Slavia Mozyr players
FC Dynamo Saint Petersburg players
Jakobstads BK players
Association football midfielders
Belarusian Premier League players
Crimean Premier League players
FC Kyzyltash Bakhchisaray players
FC Torpedo Vladimir players
Sportspeople from Novgorod Oblast